Teenage Mutant Ninja Turtles: Mutant Mayhem is an upcoming American computer-animated superhero film directed by Jeff Rowe (in his feature directorial debut) and written by Brendan O'Brien. Based on the Teenage Mutant Ninja Turtles characters created by Kevin Eastman and Peter Laird, it serves as a reboot of the Teenage Mutant Ninja Turtles film series and is the first theatrical animated film since TMNT (2007). In the film, after years of being sheltered from the human world, the Turtle brothers — Leonardo, Michelangelo, Donatello, and Raphael (voiced respectively by Nicolas Cantu, Shamon Brown Jr., Micah Abbey, and Brady Noon) — set out to be accepted as normal teenagers while taking on a mysterious crime syndicate and an army of mutants. The ensemble voice cast includes Jackie Chan, Ayo Edebiri, Seth Rogen, John Cena, Hannibal Buress, Rose Byrne, Ice Cube, Post Malone, Paul Rudd, Maya Rudolph, Natasia Demetriou, and Giancarlo Esposito.  

Nickelodeon first announced the film in June 2020, with Rogen, Evan Goldberg, and James Weaver on board as producers (under their Point Grey Pictures banner), and Rowe and O'Brien attached. The majority of the voice cast members were announced in March 2023. The team sought to explore the teenage aspect of the Turtles more than previous films and television series. The design and animation were inspired by sketches Rowe drew in his school notebooks as a teenager. Animation was provided by Mikros Animation and Cinesite. 

Teenage Mutant Ninja Turtles: Mutant Mayhem is scheduled for release in the United States on August 4, 2023, by Paramount Pictures.

Premise

Voice cast
 Nicolas Cantu as Leonardo
 Shamon Brown Jr. as Michelangelo
 Micah Abbey as Donatello
 Brady Noon as Raphael
 Jackie Chan as Splinter
 Ayo Edebiri as April O'Neil
 Seth Rogen as Bebop
 John Cena as Rocksteady
 Hannibal Buress as Genghis Frog
 Rose Byrne as Leatherhead
 Ice Cube as Superfly
 Post Malone as Ray Fillet
 Paul Rudd as Mondo Gecko
 Maya Rudolph as Cynthia Utrom
 Natasia Demetriou as Wingnut
 Giancarlo Esposito as Baxter Stockman

Production

Development
In June 2020, a new Teenage Mutant Ninja Turtles film by Nickelodeon Animation Studio, using computer animation, was revealed to be in development for Paramount Pictures. Jeff Rowe was set to direct the film, with  Brendan O'Brien writing the screenplay. Seth Rogen, Evan Goldberg, and James Weaver would produce the film through their company, Point Grey Pictures, who previously worked with O'Brien on Neighbors (2014) and its sequel Neighbors 2: Sorority Rising (2016). Brian Robbins, the president of Nickelodeon, said that "adding Seth, Evan and James’ genius to the humor and action that's already an integral part of TMNT is going to make this a next-level reinvention of the property."  

In an interview with Collider in August of that year, Rogen said that the film would put a heavy focus on teenage element of Teenage Mutant Ninja Turtles. He stated: "As a lifelong fan of Ninja Turtles, weirdly the 'Teenage' part of Teenage Mutant Ninja Turtles was always the part that stuck out to me the most. And as someone who loves teenage movies, and who’s made a lot of teenage movies, and who literally got their start in their entire profession by writing a teenage movie, the idea of kind of honing in on that element was really exciting to us. I mean, not disregarding the rest, but really using that as kind of a jumping off point for the film."

In June 2021, Rogen revealed a teaser image through his Twitter page, which contains school notes written by Leonardo, the film's original release date, and other details. Later in October of that year, the film was under the working title Teenage Mutant Ninja Turtles: The Next Chapter. Production designer, Yashar Kassai, elaborated on the project by saying, "You anchor yourself enough in the familiar elements of it so that it is easily recognizable, but then you either add to or enhance some of the existing charm of the franchise." 

In February 2022, concept art featuring a first look at early designs of the title characters was released. In July of that year, Kevin Eastman, co-creator of the Teenage Mutant Ninja Turtles, expressed his support for Rogen and his vision for the film. The following month, the official title was revealed as Teenage Mutant Ninja Turtles: Mutant Mayhem. J.J. Villard of King Star King was commissioned to design the film's logo. He drew several concepts and let the film crew pick their favorite.

Casting
The four Turtles' voices were performed by teenagers for the first time in the franchise. During the Kids' Choice Awards on March 4, 2023, Rogen revealed the actors who had been cast as the Turtles, consisting of Nicolas Cantu as Leonardo, Shamon Brown Jr. as Michelangelo, Micah Abbey as Donatello, and Brady Noon as Raphael, all of whom were in attendance. The remainder of the voice cast was announced in the same presentation after the four leads, including Jackie Chan as Splinter, Ayo Edebiri as April O'Neil, Rogen himself as Bebop, John Cena, who previously voiced Baron Draxum in the first season of the animated series Rise of the Teenage Mutant Ninja Turtles (2018–20), now voicing Rocksteady, Hannibal Buress as Genghis Frog, Rose Byrne and Natasia Demetriou as female versions of Leatherhead and Wingnut, Paul Rudd as Mondo Gecko, Rappers Ice Cube and Post Malone as Superfly and Ray Fillet, with the former being an original creation for the film, Maya Rudolph as Cynthia Utrom, and Giancarlo Esposito as Baxter Stockman.

Animation and design
The film was animated by Mikros Animation, in Montreal and Paris, alongside Cinesite's Vancouver facilities. Work had already begun by September 2021. The film's design was inspired by sketch drawings Rowe drew on his school notebooks as a teenager.

Music
In February 2023, Rogen said that Rowe likened the film's soundtrack to that of the 1999 video game Tony Hawk's Pro Skater and revealed that it will incorporate songs from the title. He described it as a "random assortment of music" that fits together well and shares the "same energy and spirit."

Marketing
Rowe showed a sneak peak of the film at the Annecy International Animation Film Festival in June 2022. Rafael Motamayor of /Film compared the film's visual aesthetic to Arcane, both having a "punk" style that he described as fun. To accompany the title announcement in August, a mural promoting the film went up in New York City.

Along with the cast announcement, a preview was shown at the Kids' Choice Awards on March 4, 2023, followed by the release of a teaser trailer two days later. It featured "Can I Kick It?" by A Tribe Called Quest. Charles Pulliam-Moore at The Verge called the animation "gorgeous," highlighting its "sketch-like art direction and the gritty / grimy texturedness." Writing for The Escapist, Matthew Razak noted the Turtles' more youthful nature compared to previous portrayals. Praising the trailer, Grant Hermanns of Screen Rant compared the film's look to those of Spider-Man: Into the Spider-Verse (2018) and The Mitchells vs. the Machines (2021), the latter of which Rowe served as a writer. That same month, Playmates Toys revealed a new line of toys based on the film, consisting of action figures, vehicles, playsets, and role play toys.

Release
Teenage Mutant Ninja Turtles: Mutant Mayhem is scheduled to be theatrically released in the United States on August 4, 2023, by Paramount Pictures. The film was initially announced for release on August 11, 2023.

Future
Robbins later revealed in June 2022 that the film is the first installment of a potential franchise.

References

External links
 
 

2023 films
2023 martial arts films
2023 action comedy films
2023 computer-animated films
2023 science fiction action films
2020s American animated films
2020s animated superhero films
2020s martial arts comedy films
2020s English-language films
American 3D films
American action comedy films
American animated superhero films
American buddy comedy films
American computer-animated films
American crime action films
American crime comedy films
American science fiction action films
American science fiction comedy films
Animated buddy films
Animated crime films
Anime-influenced Western animation
Reboot films
Animated Teenage Mutant Ninja Turtles films
Upcoming films
Animated films based on comics
Animated films about turtles
Animated films about brothers
Ninja films
Animated films about rats
Animated films set in New York (state)
Animated films set in New York City
Films produced by Seth Rogen
Films produced by Evan Goldberg
Paramount Pictures films
Paramount Pictures animated films
Nickelodeon Movies films
Nickelodeon animated films
Point Grey Pictures films